The St. Joseph North Pier Inner and Outer Lights are lighthouses in Michigan at the entrance to the St. Joseph River on Lake Michigan. The station was built in 1832 with the current lights built in 1906 and 1907; they were decommissioned in 2005.

History
St. Joseph was first platted in 1829, and the first lighthouse at the site, located on the shore, was built in 1832. Construction began on harbor piers in 1836, and by 1848 a beacon light had been established on the pier. The onshore lighthouse was replaced in 1859, and a new pierhead beacon was constructed on the south pier in 1870. In 1881, this beacon was transferred to the north pier. In 1897 a pole light was erected 400 feet shoreward to serve as a rear range light. In 1904, the pier was extended, and the range lights were moved lakeward. In 1906/07, the present set of range lights was constructed.

The 1859 lighthouse remained in use until 1919 when a tower was erected on the south pier. It was demolished in 1955. In 2008, the north pier inner and outer range lights were deemed excess. Ownership of the lights was transferred to the city of St. Joseph in 2013. A committee was formed in 2014 which raised $2 million in private donations to fully restore the pier range lights. The project to preserve the lighthouses was completed in 2016.

Postage stamp
On June 17, 1995, the United States Postal Service issued a stamp depicting the lights as part of its Great Lakes Lighthouses series.

Description
The front range tower is constructed of steel framing and covered with metal sheets. It is a conical tower that tapers from a diameter of eight feet, three inches at its base to seven feet, three inches at the top. It is topped by a nine-sided lantern room. The tower is equipped with a fifth-order Barbier and Benard lens that produced a fixed red light. The entire structure is 30 feet tall.

The rear tower is a square steel structure, 24 feet on a side, with a pyramidal roof. On top of the roof is an octagonal tower, rising two stories above the main structure. Atop the tower is a circular lantern room with helical bars, surrounded by a black iron parapet and walkway.  The tower was originally equipped with a fourth-order lens manufactured by Chance Brothers that produced a fixed red light. This lens was replaced at some point with a Fourth Order Fresnel lens manufactured by Sautter & Cie.  A catwalk extends from the second story of the lighthouse along the pier to the shoreline. A smokestack was removed from the tower in 1949 and another was added in 2016.

References

Gallery

Further reading

External links
 
 Geographic Names Information System:  

Lighthouses completed in 1906
Lighthouses completed in 1907
Lighthouses on the National Register of Historic Places in Michigan
Buildings and structures in Berrien County, Michigan
Michigan State Historic Sites
Transportation in Berrien County, Michigan
1906 establishments in Michigan
1907 establishments in Michigan
National Register of Historic Places in Berrien County, Michigan